Peter Hofmann (born 17 October 1955) is a former East German male handball player. He was a member of the East Germany national handball team. He was part of the  team at the 1988 Summer Olympics. On club level he played for SC Leipzig in Leipzig.

References

1955 births
Living people
East German male handball players
Handball players at the 1988 Summer Olympics
Olympic handball players of East Germany
Sportspeople from Leipzig